Theila siennata is a moth in the family Crambidae. It was described by Warren in 1896. It is found in Australia, where it has been recorded from Queensland. 

The larvae feed on the leaves of Hydrilla species.

References

Acentropinae
Moths described in 1896
Moths of Australia